Bistra may refer to:

Name
Female's name in Bulgaria

Populated places
 Bistra, Silistra Province, a village in Silistra Province, Bulgaria
 Bistra, Targovishte Province, a village in Targovishte Province, Bulgaria
 Bistra, Croatia, a village in Zagreb County, Croatia
 Bistra (mountain) in North Macedonia
 Bistra (peak) in Kosovo
 Bistra, Alba, a commune in Alba County, Romania
 Bistra, Maramureș, a commune in Maramureș County, Romania
 Bistra, a village in the commune Popești, Bihor County, Romania
 Bistra, Črna na Koroškem, a village in Slovenia
 Bistra, Vrhnika, village and monastery in Slovenia

Rivers in Romania
 Bistra (Arieș), a tributary of the Arieș in Alba County
 Bistra (Barcău), a tributary of the Barcău in Bihor County
 Bistra (Bicaz), a tributary of the Capra in Neamț County
 Bistra (Mureș), a tributary of the Mureș in Mureș County
 Bistra (Sebeș), a tributary of the Sebeș in Sibiu County
 Bistra (Timiș), a tributary of the Timiș in Caraș-Severin County
 Bistra (Vișeu), a tributary of the Vișeu in Maramureș County
 Bistra Mică, a tributary of the Bistra in Neamț County
 Bistra Mărului, a tributary of the Bistra in Caraș-Severin County

See also 
 Bistrița (disambiguation)
 Bistro (disambiguation)